Bạc Liêu province is a province of Vietnam. It is a coastal province, and is situated in the Mekong Delta region of the southern part of the country.

Administrative divisions
Bạc Liêu is subdivided into seven district-level sub-divisions:

 5 districts:

 Đông Hải
 Hòa Binh
 Hồng Dân
 Phước Long
 Vĩnh Lợi

 1 district-level town:
 Giá Rai
 1 provincial city:
 Bạc Liêu (capital)

They are further subdivided into seven commune-level towns (or townlets), 50 communes, and seven wards.

Geography
Bạc Liêu is located on Mekong Delta, although it is actually located slightly to the south of the Mekong's main outflows.

Economy
The most important parts of Bạc Liêu's economy are rice farming, fishing, food processing, and clothing manufacturing.

History
After the Fall of Saigon, 30 April 1975, Bạc Liêu province and Cà Mau province were merged into one new entity called Minh Hải province. In 1996, Minh Hải province was split into two, with the northeast becoming Bạc Liêu province and the southwest becoming Cà Mau province. Bac Lieu is renowned for its community of Teochew Chinese.

Culture
Vọng cổ, an important song in the traditional music of southern Vietnam, was composed in Bạc Liêu around 1918 or 1919.

Referring to Bac Lieu, many people immediately think of the homeland of Prince Bac Lieu (Công Tử Bạc Liêu) Trần Trinh Huy also called Ba Huy, or the Black Prince – was a famous player not only in Bac Lieu but even in Saigon and the South of Vietnam during the 1930s and 1940s.

References

cham sua tai bac lieu

External links

 
Provinces of Vietnam